Abdul Rashid Hassan (born 17 July 1954 in Malacca) is a former Selangor FA, Kuala Lumpur FA and Malaysia goalkeeper.

Career overview
He helped Kuala Lumpur win the Malaysia Cup hat-trick in 1987, 1988 and 1989.

With the Malaysia national team, he won two gold medal the 1977 and 1989 SEA Games. He also was a part of Malaysia squad in a 1–1 draw against England B in 1978, coached by Bobby Robson. 

Overall he earn 41 international caps for Malaysia between 1975 to 1989.

Honours
Selangor
 Malaysia Cup: 1975, 1976, 1978

Kuala Lumpur
 Malaysian League: 1988
 Malaysia Cup: 1987, 1988, 1989
 Malaysia Charity Shield: 1988

Malaysia
 SEA Games: 1977, 1989

References

Living people
Malaysian footballers
1954 births
People from Malacca
Association football goalkeepers